The Toronto Blue Jays Radio Network consists of 21 stations (17 AM, 4 FM) in 7 Canadian provinces broadcasting the team's games in English.

At the start of the 2021 season, the radio broadcasts consisted of a simulcast of the audio from the Sportsnet television broadcasts of Blue Jays games, featuring play-by-play announcer Dan Shulman and colour analysts Buck Martinez and Pat Tabler, with Rob Wong and Shoaib Ali serve as on-air hosts. The simulcasts continued through the end of July, after which a dedicated radio broadcast was used with Ben Wagner calling play-by-play. From 2018 to 2020, the radio team consisted of play-by-play announcers Wagner and Mike Wilner. Wagner succeeded longtime radio announcer Jerry Howarth following the latter's retirement, while former radio analyst Joe Siddall moved to the television pregame show. 

During its all-sports era from 2007 to 2011, Montreal station CKAC broadcast some games in French.

Flagship (1 station)
590/CJCL: Toronto, Ontario

Affiliates (20 stations)

Alberta (2 stations)
960/CFAC: Calgary
101.7/CKER-FM: Edmonton

British Columbia (1 station)
650/CISL: Vancouver

Nova Scotia (1 station)
95.7/CJNI-FM: Halifax

Ontario (9 stations)
570/CKGL: Kitchener
980/CFPL: London
600/CKAT: North Bay
1310/CIWW: Ottawa
90.5/CJMB-FM: Peterborough - Not broadcasting games currently.
1070/CHOK: Sarnia
101.1/CJET-FM: Smiths Falls (simulcast with CIWW-Ottawa)
107.1/CJCS-FM: Stratford
920/CKNX: Wingham

Quebec (1 station)
690/CKGM: Montreal

Saskatchewan (4 stations)
1150/CJSL: Estevan
1210/CFYM: Kindersley
1330/CJYM: Rosetown
1190/CFSL: Weyburn

Former affiliates (8 stations)
580/CKY: Winnipeg, Manitoba
730/CKAC: Montreal (part-time affiliate, French only, c. 2007-2011)
 simulcast on up to 10 relays
820/CHAM: Hamilton, Ontario (2009-2010)
900/CHML: Hamilton, Ontario (2011)
960/CFFX: Kingston, Ontario
1570/CKMW: Winkler, Manitoba
91.9/CKNI-FM: Moncton, New Brunswick (2006-2014)
88.9/CHNI-FM: Saint John, New Brunswick (2006-2014)

References

External links
 List of Blue Jays radio stations

Toronto Blue Jays
Major League Baseball on the radio
Sports radio networks in Canada